The Arts House (formerly the Old Parliament House) is a multi-disciplinary arts venue in Singapore. The venue plays host to art exhibitions and concerts. Built in 1827, the Old Parliament House is the oldest government building and perhaps the oldest surviving building in Singapore. The building was home to the Parliament of Singapore from 1965 to 1999, when it moved to an adjacent new building.

History
The building occupies one of the most historic sites of Singapore.  During the refurbishment of the building in 1989, archaeological evidence of older habitation in the area was uncovered with stoneware and earthenware dating back to the 13th and 14th centuries found.  The building's river frontage was also where Sir Stamford Raffles was presumed to have landed on 29 January 1819. The area was occupied by Temenggong Abdul Rahman and his family and followers. Raffles would later persuade the Temenggong to move to Telok Blangah in 1823 as he planned for the land to be used for public and administrative purposes.

Design and construction

The building was designed as a Neo-Palladian mansion by architect George Drumgoole Coleman for a Scottish merchant, John Argyle Maxwell, who was based in Java. It was intended to be his private residence, however, Maxwell never occupied the house due in part to a dispute over the ownership of the land on which the house was built.  Raffles had originally allocated the land for government use in his Town Plan, however, Raffles' successor John Crawfurd issued a permit allowing Maxwell to build a house on the site.

The construction of the Old Parliament House began in 1826 and it was completed in 1827. Maxwell applied for a statutory grant to the site in 1827, and the Resident Councillor of Singapore, John Prince objected as the land was intended for government use.  A compromise was then struck whereby Maxwell was granted a 999-year lease in June 1827, but the house would be leased back to the government for a 500 rupees monthly rent.   Later Maxwell's residence went up for auction which the colonial government won with a bid of $15,600 Spanish dollars, and the ownership of the courthouse finally transferred to Governor George Bonham and the East India Company on 10 October 1842.

Extension and uses
The building was initially used as a court house, and other government offices including the Land Office also moved into the building. The first court session was held in the central room on the first floor at the front of the building.

In 1839, a new single-storey annex was built on an adjacent plot of land, forming what is now the Former Attorney-General's Chambers building later incorporated into the Parliament House.  The Courts then moved into this new building (later on to Empress Place Building), and the vacated space was then used for government offices.  The government offices were sited at the building until 1875 when the Supreme Court moved back in after the building was renovated.

The building went through several major extension works. The first was carried out between 1873 and 1875 by John Frederick Adolphus McNair. In 1901, the building was extended towards the Singapore River. Coleman's original design was lost as a result of the extension works. In 1909, two courtrooms were reconstructed and a residence for the Attorney General was built, and the architectural style of the building was transformed from Coleman's Neo-Palladian design to appear more Victorian. In 1939, the Supreme Court moved into its new building further down the road, and the building was then used as a storehouse, and later for the Department of Social Welfare after the Second World War.

The building was refurbished again in 1953 to make way for the new Legislative Assembly of Singapore, and works were completed in July 1954. The design was carried out by T. H. H. Hancock who was the Senior Architect of the Public Works Department of Singapore. The Legislative Assembly was opened by the governor Sir John Fearns Nicoll.

The Arts House served as one of the two venues held for the opening of the 14th Parliament of Singapore on 24 August 2020, the other being Parliament House; the multiple venues were used for the first time in Singapore's history as a precaution measure for social distancing as a result of the ongoing COVID-19 pandemic.

As Parliament House
When the Chief Minister David Marshall was elected in 1955, he was given an office in the building. The building was renamed Parliament House in August 1965 when Singapore gained independence.

A bronze statue of an elephant is located at the front of the Old Parliament House which was a gift from King Chulalongkorn or King Rama V of Siam (now known as Thailand) as a token of appreciation after his stay on 16 March 1871. The country is the first foreign nation visited by a Siamese King. It was originally located at the Victoria Theatre and Concert Hall but was replaced in 1919 with a statue for Stamford Raffles.

The arches at the porch of the building and Palladian windows of the front façade were part of the original design, although the building currently appeared more Neoclassical in style.

The building was gazetted a national monument on 14 February 1992. On 6 September 1999, the Parliament of Singapore moved into an adjacent new building which faces North Bridge Road.

The Arts House at The Old Parliament
The Arts House at The Old Parliament opened on 26 March 2004 as an arts and heritage centre. The old building was restored, and the furnishings and the design were preserved. The Chambers were converted into a function room where music performances could be held. Art exhibitions and other functions are also regularly held at the gallery, which has Tuscan style-columns and cornices.

See also
Parliament House
List of concert halls

References

Tan, Sumiko (2000) The Singapore Parliament: The House We Built Times Media, Singapore 
Norman Edwards, Peter Keys (1996), Singapore – A Guide to Buildings, Streets, Places, Times Books International,

External links
The Arts House

Government buildings completed in 1827
Arts centres in Singapore
Downtown Core (Singapore)
Landmarks in Singapore
Legislative buildings
Parliament of Singapore
National monuments of Singapore
Tourist attractions in Singapore
Former seats of national legislatures
1827 establishments in Singapore
19th-century architecture in Singapore